Poor Little Colombine (German: Arme kleine Colombine) is a 1927 German silent drama film directed by Franz Seitz and starring Paul Rehkopf, Hilde Jennings and Wolfgang Zilzer. It was shot at the Johannisthal Studios in Berlin. The film's sets were designed by the art director Max Heilbronner.

Cast
Paul Rehkopf as Peter Lanner, woodcarver
Hilde Jennings as Aennchen, his daughter
Wolfgang Zilzer as Christoph Burger 
Walter Rilla as Ernst Honsel 
Wilhelm Diegelmann as Karl Meinert, his uncle 
Egon von Jordan as Fritz Helbig 
Charlotte Susa as Lotte Monti 
Hermann Picha as Johannes Rabe 
Valeska Stock as Frau Rabe 
Maria Forescu as Frau Tratsch, fortune teller

References

External links

Films of the Weimar Republic
Films directed by Franz Seitz
German silent feature films
German black-and-white films
German drama films
1927 drama films
Silent drama films
1920s German films
Films shot at Johannisthal Studios